Reamsbottom is a surname. Notable people with the surname include:

Barry Reamsbottom (born 1949), Scottish civil servant and trade union leader
Sonia Reamsbottom (born 1962), Irish cricketer

See also
Ramsbottom (surname)